Lija Laizāne (born 6 July 1993) is a Latvian racing cyclist, who rides for UCI Women's Continental Team . She rode at the UCI Road World Championships in 2014, 2015 and 2020.

For the 2023 season, Laizāne will join UCI Women's Continental Team .

Major results
Source: 

2010 
 3rd Time trial, National Road Championships
2011 
 1st  Time trial, National Road Championships
2012 
 2nd Time trial, National Road Championships
2014 
 3rd Time trial, National Road Championships
 9th Chrono des Nations
2015 
 National Road Championships
1st  Time trial
1st  Road race
2016 
 National Road Championships
1st  Time trial
1st  Road race
2017 
 National Road Championships
1st  Time trial
1st  Road race
2018
 National Road Championships
1st  Time trial
1st  Road race
2019
 National Road Championships
1st  Road race
2nd Time trial
2021
 National Road Championships
2nd Time trial
3rd Road race
2022
 National Road Championships
2nd Time trial
3rd Road race

References

External links

1993 births
Living people
Latvian female cyclists
Sportspeople from Riga
Cyclists at the 2010 Summer Youth Olympics